Media literacy is an expanded conceptualization of literacy that includes the ability to access and analyze media messages as well as create, reflect and take action, using the power of information and communication to make a difference in the world. Media literacy is not restricted to one medium and is understood as a set of competencies that are essential for work, life, and citizenship. Media literacy education is the process used to advance media literacy competencies, and it is intended to promote awareness of media influence and create an active stance towards both consuming and creating media. Media literacy education is part of the curriculum in the United States and some European Union countries, and an interdisciplinary global community of media scholars and educators engages in knowledge and scholarly and professional journals and national membership associations.

Media literacy education

Education for media literacy often uses an inquiry-based pedagogic model that encourages people to ask questions about what they watch, hear, and read. Media literacy moves beyond the traditional no print text and moves to examining more contemporary sources. Some examples of media literacy include, but are not limited to television, video games, photographs, and audio messages. Media literacy education provides tools to help people develop receptive media capability to critically analyze messages, offers opportunities for learners to broaden their experience of media, and helps them develop generative media capability to increase creative skills in making their own media messages. Critical analyses can include identifying author, purpose and point of view, examining construction techniques and genres, examining patterns of media representation, and detecting propaganda, censorship, and bias in news and public affairs programming (and the reasons for these). Media literacy education may explore how structural features—such as media ownership, or its funding model—affect the information presented.

As defined by The Core Principles of Media Literacy Education, "the purpose of media literacy education is to help individuals of all ages develop the habits of inquiry and skills of expression that they need to be critical thinkers, effective communicators and active citizens in today’s world." Education about media literacy can begin in early childhood by developing a pedagogy around more critical thinking and deeper analysis and questioning of concepts and texts. As students age and enter adulthood, the use of learning media literacy will be impactful in identifying ethical and technical standards in media as well as understanding how media ties to their cognitive, social, and emotional needs.

In North America and Europe, media literacy includes both empowerment and protectionist perspectives. Media literate people can skillfully create and produce media messages, both to show understanding of the specific qualities of each medium, as well as to create media and participate as active citizens. Media literacy can be seen as contributing to an expanded conceptualization of literacy, treating mass media, popular culture and digital media as new types of 'texts' that require analysis and evaluation. By transforming the process of media consumption into an active and critical process, people gain greater awareness of the potential for misrepresentation and manipulation, and understand the role of mass media and participatory media in constructing views of reality. 

Media literacy education is sometimes conceptualized as a way to address the negative dimensions of media, including media manipulation, misinformation, gender and racial stereotypes and violence, the sexualization of children, and concerns about loss of privacy, cyberbullying and Internet predators. By building knowledge and competencies in using media and technology, media literacy education may provide a type of protection to children and young people by helping them make good choices in their media consumption habits, and patterns of usage.

Some scholars see media literacy as a dialogical process for social and environmental justice that incorporates Paulo Freire's (1970) notion of praxis, "reflection and action upon the world in order to transform it" (p. 36). This pedagogical project questions representations of class, gender, race, sexuality and other forms of identity and challenges media messages that reproduce oppression and discrimination. Proponents of media literacy education argue that the inclusion of media literacy into school curricula promotes civic engagement, increases awareness of the power structures inherent in popular media and aids students in gaining necessary critical and inquiry skills. Media can have a positive or negative impact on society, but media literacy education enables the students to discern inescapable risks of manipulation, propaganda and media bias. A growing body of research has begun focusing on the impact of media literacy on youth. In an important meta-analysis of more than 50 studies, published in the Journal of Communication, media literacy interventions were found to have positive effects on knowledge, criticism, perceived realism, influence, behavioral beliefs, attitudes, self-efficacy, and behavior. Media literacy also encourages critical thinking and self-expression, enabling citizens to decisively exercise their democratic rights. Media literacy enables the populace to understand and contribute to public discourse, and, eventually, make sound decisions when electing their leaders. People who are media literate can adopt a critical stance when decoding media messages, no matter their views regarding a position. Likewise, the use of mobile devices by children and adolescents is increasing significantly; therefore, it is relevant to investigate the level of advertising literacy of parents who interact as mediators between children and mobile advertising.  

Digitalisation and the expansion of information and communication technologies at the beginning of the 21st century have substantially modified the media and their relationship with users, which logically modifies the basic principles of media education. It is no longer so much a question of educating critical receivers as of training citizens as responsible prosumers in virtual and hybrid environments. Media education currently incorporates phenomena such as social networks, virtual communities, big data, artificial intelligence, cyber-surveillance, etc., as well as training the individual in the critical use of mobile devices of all kinds.

Theoretical approaches to media literacy education
A variety of scholars have proposed theoretical frameworks for media literacy. In 2010, Renee Hobbs developed the AACRA model (access, analyze, create, reflect and act) and identifies three frames for introducing media literacy to learners: authors and audiences (AA), messages and meanings (MM), and representation and reality (RR), synthesizing the scholarly literature from media literacy, information literacy, visual literacy and new literacies. This model explicitly conceptualizes media literacy as an expanded conceptualization of literacy. 

David Buckingham offers "a theoretical framework which can be applied to the whole range of contemporary media and to 'older' media as well, as part of the practice of media education: Production, Language, Representation, and Audience." Elaborating on the concepts presented by David Buckingham, Henry Jenkins discusses the emergence of a participatory culture and stresses the significance of "new media literacies"—a set of cultural competencies and social skills that young people need in the new media landscape.

Douglas Kellner and Jeff Share have categorized four different approaches to media education: the protectionist approach, media arts education, media literacy movement, and critical media literacy. The protectionist approach views audiences of mass media as vulnerable to cultural, ideological or moral influences, and needing protection by means of education. The media arts education approach focuses on creative production of different media forms by learners. The media literacy movement is an attempt to bring traditional aspects of literacy from the educational sphere and apply it to media. Critical media literacy aims to analyze and understand the power structures that shape media representations and the ways in which audiences work to make meaning through dominant, oppositional and negotiated readings of media. "The goal of critical media literacy is to engage with media through critically examining representations, systems, structures, ideologies, and power dynamics that shape and reproduce culture and society. It is an inquiry-based process for analyzing and creating media by interrogating the relationships between power and knowledge. Critical media literacy is a dialogical process for social and environmental justice that incorporates Paulo Freire's (1970) notion of praxis, "reflection and action upon the world in order to transform it" (p. 36). This pedagogical project questions representations of class, gender, race, sexuality and other forms of identity and challenges media messages that reproduce oppression and discrimination. It celebrates positive representations and beneficial aspects of media while challenging problems and negative consequences, recognizing media are never neutral. Critical media literacy is a transformative pedagogy for developing and empowering critical, caring, nurturing, and conscientious people.”

Research on media literacy education 
The scholarly knowledge community publishes research in the Journal of Media Literacy Education and other journals, and a robust global community of media literacy scholars has emerged since the European Commission set an ambitious objective for Europe to advance its knowledge economy while being more culturally inclusive. Empirical research on media literacy education is carried out by social science researchers generally falls into three major categories, focusing on (a) health outcomes; (b) curriculum and instruction; and (c) political attitudes, media use and behavior. Meta-analysis of a large number of these studies has found that the average effect size was strong and positive for outcomes including media knowledge, criticism, perceived realism, influence, attitudes, self-efficacy, and behavior.  In two recent nationally-representative surveys of U.S. residents, media literacy competencies were associated with health-related decision making in the context of COVID-19, and the study found that media literacy skills promote the adoption of recommended health behaviors. Health interventions have also explored issues such as media violence, stereotypes in the representation of gender and race, materialism and consumer culture, and the glamorization of unhealthy behavior, including smoking. Research shows that media literacy is associated with increased resilience in children and youth that is effective in a wide variety of contexts and learning environments. 

Media literacy competencies are frequently measured using self-report measures, where people rate or agree with various statements. These measures are easy to administer to a large group of people. Some researchers use performance- or competency-based measures to examine people's actual ability to critically analyze news, advertising, or entertainment.  Media literacy programs that focus on political attitudes and behavior are thought to provide the cognitive and social scaffolding needed for civic engagement. Research on high school students has shown that participation in a media literacy program was positively associated with information-seeking motives, media knowledge, and news analysis skills. Experimental research has shown that young people ages 15 - 27 who had received media literacy education in schools were better able to evaluate the accuracy of political content, even when it aligned with their existing political beliefs.

History and international applications
Media literacy education is actively focused on the instructional methods and pedagogy of media literacy, integrating theoretical and critical frameworks rising from constructivist learning theory, media studies, and cultural studies scholarship. This work has arisen from a legacy of media and technology use in education throughout the 20th century and the emergence of cross-disciplinary work at the intersections of media studies and education. The oldest organization studying Media Literacy is the National Telemedia Council, based in Madison Wisconsin and led by Marieli Rowe for over 50 years.  The Voices of Media Literacy, a project through the Center for Media Literacy, sponsored by Tessa Jolls, included first-person interviews with 20 media literacy pioneers active prior to the 1990s in English-speaking countries. The project provided historical context for the rise of media literacy from individuals who helped influenced the field.

UNESCO has investigated which countries were incorporating media studies into different schools' curricula as a means to develop new initiatives in the field of media education. Relying on 72 experts on media education in 52 countries around the world, the study identified that (1) media literacy occurs inside the context of formal education; (2) it generally relies of partnerships with media industries and media regulators; and (3) there is a robust research community who have examined the needs of educators and obstacles to future development.  Although progress around the world is uneven, all respondents realized the importance of media education, as well as the need for formal recognition from their government and policymakers. 

In recent years, a wide variety of media literacy education initiatives have increased collaboration in Europe and North America, Many cultural, social, and political factors shape how media literacy education initiatives are believed to be significant. Mind Over Media is an example of an international collaboration in media literacy education: it is a digital learning platform that relies on crowdsourced examples of contemporary propaganda shared by educators and learners from around the world. For educators who are developing media literacy programs, the study of propaganda has become increasingly important, especially with the rise of fake news and disinformation.

Media literacy programs may emphasize these components: Critical thinking: understanding how the media industry works and how media messages are constructed; questioning the motivations of content producers in order to make informed choices about content selection and use; recognizing different types of media content and evaluating content for truthfulness, reliability and value; recognizing and managing online security and safety risks;

Creativity: advancing competencies through activities that involve creating, building and generating media content, often through collaboration; 

Intercultural dialogue: practices of human communication, empathy and social interaction, including those that challenge radicalization, violent extremism and hate speech;

Media skills: the ability to search, find and navigate and use media content and services;

Participation and civic engagement: active participation in the economic, social, creative, cultural aspects of society using media in ways that advance democratic participation and fundamental human rights.

North America
In North America, the beginnings of a formalized approach to media literacy as a topic of education is often attributed to the 1978 formation of the Ontario-based Association for Media Literacy (AML). Before that time, instruction in media education was usually the purview of individual teachers and practitioners. Canada was the first country in North America to require media literacy in the school curriculum. Every province has mandated media education in its curriculum. For example, the new curriculum of Quebec mandates media literacy from Grade 1 until final year of secondary school (Secondary V). The launching of media education in Canada came about for two reasons. One reason was the concern about the pervasiveness of American popular culture and the other was the education system-driven necessity of contexts for new educational paradigms. Canadian communication scholar Marshall McLuhan ignited the North American educational movement for media literacy in the 1950s and 1960s. Two of Canada's leaders in Media Literacy and Media Education are Barry Duncan and John Pungente. Duncan died on June 6, 2012. Even after he retired from classroom teaching, Barry had still been active in media education. Pungente is a Jesuit priest who has promoted media literacy since the early 1960s.

Media literacy education has been an interest in the United States since the early 20th century, when high school English teachers first started using film to develop students' critical thinking and communication skills. However, media literacy education is distinct from simply using media and technology in the classroom, a distinction that is exemplified by the difference between "teaching with media" and "teaching about media." In the 1950s and 60s, the ‘film grammar’ approach to media literacy education developed in the United States. Where educators began to show commercial films to children, having them learn a new terminology consisting of words such as: fade, dissolve, truck, pan, zoom, and cut. Films were connected to literature and history. To understand the constructed nature of film, students explored plot development, character, mood and tone. Then, during the 1970s and 1980s, attitudes about mass media and mass culture began to shift around the English-speaking world. Educators began to realize the need to “guard against our prejudice of thinking of print as the only real medium that the English teacher has a stake in.” A whole generation of educators began to not only acknowledge film and television as new, legitimate forms of expression and communication, but also explored practical ways to promote serious inquiry and analysis—- in higher education, in the family, in schools and in society. In 1976, Project Censored began using a service learning model to cultivate media literacy skills among students and faculty in higher education.

Media literacy education began to appear in state English education curriculum frameworks by the early 1990s, as a result of increased awareness in the central role of media in the context of contemporary culture. Nearly all 50 states have language that supports media literacy in state curriculum frameworks. Additionally, an increasing number of school districts have begun to develop school-wide programs, elective courses, and other after-school opportunities for media analysis and production. 

Founded in 2008, the News Literacy Project initially offered curricular materials and other resources for educators who taught U.S. students in grades 6-12 (middle school and high school), focusing primarily on helping students learn to sort fact from fiction in the digital age. (In 2020 NLP expanded its work to include audiences of all ages and made all of its resources free of charge.) Similar programs for students and adults are also offered by the Poynter Institute (MediaWise) and the Stanford History Education Group at Stanford University (Civic Online Reasoning). Assessments of students who have taken such programs and those who have not have shown that the students with media literacy training can more easily recognize false or misleading content and determine whether a source of information is credible.

Interdisciplinary scholarship in media literacy education is emerging. Stony Brook University's Center for News Literacy, founded in 2007 by Howard Schneider, the dean of the university's journalism school, grew out of his collaboration "with hard science, social science and humanities experts ... to build a course that helps students understand their own biases as well as the importance of reliable information to their inherited role as stewards of a democracy." In 2009, a scholarly journal, the Journal of Media Literacy Education, was launched to support the work of scholars and practitioners in the field. Universities such as Appalachian State University, Columbia University, Ithaca College, New York University, Brooklyn College of the City University of New York, the University of Texas-Austin, The University of Rhode Island and the University of Maryland offer courses and summer institutes in media literacy for pre-service teachers and graduate students. Brigham Young University offers a graduate program in media education specifically for in-service teachers. Since 2011, the University of California, Los Angeles (UCLA) Graduate School of Education and Information Studies' Teacher Education Program has required all new teachers take a 4-unit course on Critical Media Literacy.

Europe
The UK is widely regarded as a leader in the development of media literacy education. Key agencies that have been involved in this development include the British Film Institute, the English and Media Centre Film Education the Centre for the Study of Children, Youth and Media at the Institute of Education, London, and the DARE centre (Digital Arts Research Education), a collaboration between University College London and the British Film Institute. The ‘promotion' of media literacy also became a UK Government policy under New Labour, and was enshrined in the Communications Act 2003 as a responsibility of the new media regulator, Ofcom.  After an initial burst of activity, however, Ofcom's work in this regard was progressively reduced in scope, and from the Coalition government onwards, the promotion of media literacy was reduced to a matter of market research – what Wallis & Buckingham have described as an ‘undead' policy.

In the Nordics, media education was introduced into the Finnish elementary curriculum in 1970 and into high schools in 1977. The concepts devised at the Lycée franco-finlandais d'Helsinki became the standard nation-wide in 2016. Media education has been compulsory in Sweden since 1980 and in Denmark since 1970.

France has taught film from the inception of the medium, but it has only been recently that conferences and media courses for teachers have been organized with the inclusion of media production.

Germany saw theoretical publications on media literacy in the 1970s and 1980s, with a growing interest for media education inside and outside the educational system in the 80s and 90s.

In the Netherlands media literacy was placed in the agenda by the Dutch government in 2006 as an important subject for the Dutch society. In April, 2008, an official center has been created (mediawijsheid expertisecentrum = medialiteracy expertisecenter) by the Dutch government. This center is a network organization consisting of different stakeholders with expertise on the subject.

In Russia, the 1970s-1990s brought about the first official programs of film and media education, increasing interest in doctoral studies focused on media education,  as well as theoretical and empirical work on media education by O.Baranov (Tver), S.Penzin (Voronezh), G.Polichko, U.Rabinovich (Kurgan), Y.Usov (Moscow), Alexander Fedorov (Taganrog), A.Sharikov (Moscow) and others. Recent developments in media education in Russia are the 2002 registration of a new ‘Media Education’ (No. 03.13.30) specialization for the pedagogical universities, and the 2005 launch of the Media Education academic journal, partly sponsored by the ICOS UNESCO ‘Information for All’.

Montenegro became one of the few countries in the world that have introduced media education into their curriculums, when in 2009 “media literacy” was introduced as an optional subject for 16 and 17-year-old students of Gymnasium high schools.

In Ukraine, media education is in the second stage (2017–2020) of development and standardization. Main centres of media education include the Ivan Franko University of Lviv (led by Borys Potyatynyk), Institute of Higher Education of the National Academy of Pedagogical Sciences of Ukraine (Hanna Onkovych), Institute of Social and Political Psychology of the National Academy of Pedagogical Sciences of Ukraine (Lyubov Naidyonova).

In Spanish legislation, digital competence is considered as an umbrella term that "includes information and data literacy, communication and collaboration, media education, digital content creation (including programming), security (including digital wellbeing and cybersecurity skills), digital citizenship issues, privacy, intellectual property, problem solving, and computational and critical thinking".

Asia
Media literacy education is not yet as widespread or as advanced in Asia, comparative to the U.S. or Western countries. Beginning in the 1990s, there has been a shift towards media literacy in East Asia. In recent years, media literacy education is growing in Asia, with several programs in place across countries throughout the Asian Pacific region.

Teachers in Beijing, China, are recognizing the importance of media literacy education in primary schools based on their own level of concern for the need of media literacy in education. Other programs in China include Little Masters, a Chinese publication created by children that reports on a variety of issues, helping children learn journalism and basic teamwork and communication skills. Studies have been done to test levels of media literacy among Chinese-speaking students in China and Taiwan, but further research is needed. Information literacy is highly regarded in education, but media literacy less recognized.

In India, the Cybermohalla program started in 2001 with the aim to bring access to technology to youths.

In Vietnam, the Young Journalists Group (YOJO) was created in 1998 in collaboration with UNICEF and the Vietnamese National Radio to combat false accounts by the media.

In Singapore, the Media Development Authority (MDA) defines media literacy and recognizes it as an important tool for the 21st century, but only from the reading aspect of the term.

Beginning in the 2017 school year, children in Taiwan study a new curriculum designed to teach critical reading of propaganda and the evaluation of sources. Called "media literacy," the course provides training in journalism in the new information society.

In Iran, Nasra is a movement aiming to meet the learning needs of all children, youth, and adults in 2018. This social movement focuses on digital media use and mental health and increases the skills of using the media for the public.

Middle East
Jordan is moving forward in fostering media and information literacy, which is crucial to fighting extremism and hate speech, Jordan Media Institute is working on spreading the concepts and skills of positive interaction with the media and tools of communication technology and digital media, and to reduce their disadvantages.
An academy in Beirut, Lebanon opened in 2013, called the Media and Digital Literacy Academy of Beirut (MDLAB) with the goal for students to be critical media consumers.

Visual stereotypes continue to surround Middle Eastern cultures in visual media. Third and Fourth graders in Kuwait are learning to address these stereotypes through media literacy education. Through this kind of education, Arab people can challenge representation in all media.

Australia
In Australia, media education was influenced by developments in Britain related to the inoculation, popular arts, and demystification approaches. Key theorists who influenced Australian media education were Graeme Turner and John Hartley who helped develop Australian media and cultural studies. During the 1980s and 1990s, Western Australians Robyn Quin and Barrie MacMahon wrote seminal textbooks such as Real Images, translating many complex media theories into classroom appropriate learning frameworks. At the same time Carmen Luke connected media literacy with feminism promoting a more critical approach to media education. In most Australian states, media is one of five strands of the Arts Key Learning Area and includes "essential learnings" or "outcomes" listed for various stages of development.  At the senior level (years 11 and 12), several states offer Media Studies as an elective.  For example, many Queensland schools offer Film, Television and New Media, while Victorian schools offer VCE Media. Media education is supported by the teacher professional association Australian Teachers of Media. With the introduction of a new Australian National Curriculum, schools are beginning to implement media education as part of the arts curriculum, using media literacy as a means to educate students how to deconstruct, construct and identify themes in media.

People are avid media users in Australia with various social platforms to choose from. Western Sydney University conducted a study in 2020 involving 3,510 Australian adults on all media activities.  This study showed that Australians use various types of media and are very confident in their abilities, but not as confident in their media literacy education.  This study also showed that an increase in media literacy can also provide benefits for civic engagement.

See also

 Critical literacy
 Digital literacy
 Discourse
 Information and media literacy
 Information literacy
 Intertextuality
Journal of Media Literacy Education
Mind Over Media
 Multiliteracy
Postliterate society
 Transmediation
 Visual literacy

References

External links
National Association for Media Literacy Education
 Peter Medlin, WNIJ, "Illinois Is the First State to Have High Schools Teach News Literacy," National Public Radio, August 12, 2021

Literacy
Mass media
Media studies
Pedagogy
Criticism of journalism